Saucon Valley High School is a four-year public high school in Hellertown, Pennsylvania in the Lehigh Valley region of eastern Pennsylvania. It is located at 2100 Polk Valley Road in Hellertown in Northampton County.

It is the only high school in the Saucon Valley School District, which is consolidated in a single complex, the Saucon Valley School District Campus, as of September 1999. The campus, spread across , combines the high school, middle school, elementary school, and administrative offices all under one roof, and also includes ball fields, playgrounds, stadium, and track facilities.

As of the 2021–22 school year, the school had an enrollment of 690 students, according to National Center for Education Statistics data.

The school's colors are red and black, and its mascot is the panther.

Athletics

Saucon Valley High School students participate in a range of sports, including football, baseball, softball, basketball, soccer, tennis, cross country, swimming, wrestling, field hockey, volleyball, lacrosse, golf, and track and field. The school competes in District XI tournaments, and is part of the Colonial League and the PIAA. Eligibility to participate is set by school board policies.

Notable alumni
Devon, adult film actress
Glenn Hetrick, actor, designer, and producer, Star Trek: Discovery and The Hunger Games
Bailey Noble, actress, True Blood

References

External links
Official website
Saucon Valley High School sports coverage at ''The Express-Times

1999 establishments in Pennsylvania
Educational institutions established in 1999
Public high schools in Pennsylvania
Schools in Northampton County, Pennsylvania